Coryphantha pycnacantha is a cactus species endemic to central Mexico.

It is native to the states of Hidalgo, Puebla, Tlaxcala, and Veracruz

It grows on deep lava soils, and is an IUCN Red List Endangered species.

References

External links
 IUCN Red List report on Pediocactus sileri (Siler's Pincushion Cactus)

pycnacantha
Cacti of Mexico
Endemic flora of Mexico
Flora of Hidalgo (state)
Flora of Puebla
Flora of Tlaxcala
Flora of Veracruz
Endangered biota of Mexico
Endangered flora of North America